The Samuel Goldwyn Company was an American independent film company founded by Samuel Goldwyn Jr., the son of the famous Hollywood mogul, Samuel Goldwyn, in 1978.

Background 
The company originally distributed and acquired art-house films from around the world to U.S. audiences; they soon added original productions to their roster as well, starting with The Golden Seal in 1983.

In succeeding years, the Goldwyn company was able to obtain (from Samuel Sr.'s estate) the rights to all films produced under the elder Goldwyn's supervision, including the original Bulldog Drummond (1929), Arrowsmith (1931), and Guys and Dolls (1955). The company also acquired some distribution rights to several films and television programs that were independently produced but released by other companies, including Sayonara, the Hal Roach–produced Laurel & Hardy–starring vehicle Babes in Toyland (1934), the Flipper TV series produced by MGM Television, the Academy Award–winning Tom Jones (1963), and the Rodgers and Hammerstein film productions of South Pacific (1958) and Oklahoma! (1955), as well as the CBS Television adaptation of Cinderella (1965).

Animated films include Swan Lake, Aladdin and the Magic Lamp, The Care Bears Movie, The Chipmunk Adventure and Rock-a-Doodle. Among the television programs in the Goldwyn company's library are the television series American Gladiators,  Gladiators, Gladiators: Train 2 Win, and Steve Krantz's miniseries Dadah Is Death.

In 1991, after a merger with Heritage Entertainment, Inc., the company went public as Samuel Goldwyn Entertainment. Heritage and Goldwyn attempted to merge during late 1990, but the plans fell apart while Heritage went through a Chapter 11 bankruptcy. The merger also allowed Goldwyn to inherit the Landmark Theatres chain, which was a unit of Heritage.

That company and its library were acquired by Metromedia on July 2, 1996, for US$125 million. To coincide with the purchase, the Samuel Goldwyn Company was renamed Goldwyn Entertainment Company, and was reconstituted as a subsidiary of Metromedia's Orion Pictures unit. That year, Orion and Goldwyn became part of the Metromedia Entertainment Group (MEG). Goldwyn became the specialty films unit of MEG, though they would seek out films with crossover appeal. While Orion and Goldwyn would share the overhead costs, the production/acquisition operations would operate independently from each other.

In 1997, Metromedia sold its entertainment group to Metro-Goldwyn-Mayer (MGM). The Landmark Theatres group, which Metromedia did not sell to MGM, was taken over by Silver Cinemas, Inc. on April 27, 1998.

In September 1997, the company was renamed Goldwyn Films and operated as MGM's specialty films unit. A month later, Samuel Goldwyn Jr. sued MGM and Metromedia, claiming that he was abruptly let go of the company despite promises that he would continue to run it under different ownership. Another concern in the lawsuit was the use of the Goldwyn name, with the defendants being accused of “palming off specialized films produced or acquired by” the unit as though the plaintiff was still involved in its management. Goldwyn Films changed its name to G2 Films in January 1999 as part of the settlement.

In July 1999, G2 Films was renamed United Artists International. As well as all that, UA became an arthouse film producer/distributor. The younger Goldwyn has since gone on to found Samuel Goldwyn Films. This successor company has continued to release independent films such as What the Bleep Do We Know!? and the Academy Award–nominated The Squid and the Whale.

Since the new Goldwyn company was formed, MGM currently holds much of the original Goldwyn Company's holdings (including, with few exceptions, the non-Goldwyn-produced properties) that would end up with the library of Orion Pictures, now an MGM division.  One Goldwyn-produced film, The Hurricane, which was a part of the original Goldwyn Company library, has had its ownership returned to its original distributor, United Artists (also an MGM division).

Filmography

1970s

1980s

1990s

Other names 
 Samuel Goldwyn Entertainment
 Goldwyn Entertainment Company
 G2 Films
 Goldwyn Films

Successor 
 Samuel Goldwyn Films
 United Artists Films, Inc. (1999–2006)

See also 
 Samuel Goldwyn Television
 Samuel Goldwyn Studio
 Samuel Goldwyn Productions
 Metro-Goldwyn-Mayer
 Samuel Goldwyn Films

References 

Entertainment companies established in 1978
Mass media companies established in 1978
Mass media companies disestablished in 1999
Film distributors of the United States
Film production companies of the United States
Defunct American film studios
Cinema of Southern California
Entertainment companies based in California
Companies based in Los Angeles
1979 establishments in California
1999 disestablishments in California
Defunct companies based in Greater Los Angeles
Former Metro-Goldwyn-Mayer subsidiaries
Metromedia